Siniša Hajdaš Dončić (born 29 June 1974) is a Croatian politician and member of the center-left Social Democratic Party. From 17 June 2009 until 19 April 2012 he served as Prefect of the Krapina-Zagorje County, and from 19 April 2012 to 22 January 2016 as Minister of Maritime Affairs, Transport and Infrastructure in the Cabinet of Zoran Milanović.

Education 

Siniša Hajdaš Dončić graduated on Faculty of Economics and Business, University of Zagreb in 1999. He has finished postgraduate study on Faculty of Economics and Business, University of Zagreb in 2002, and defended his doctoral dissertation of faculty of Economics in Split in 2012.

Professional career 

From 2002, he has been lecturer on Professional Business School of Higher Education LIBERTAS and college for business and management Baltazar Adam Krčelić
From 2002 until 2006 he was head of department for economy, agriculture and tourism at Krapina-Zagorje County, and from 2006 until becoming perfect of Krapina-Zagorje County, he was appointed as a director of Zagorje development Agency.

References

Living people
1974 births
Government ministers of Croatia
Social Democratic Party of Croatia politicians
People from Zabok
Faculty of Economics and Business, University of Zagreb alumni
Representatives in the modern Croatian Parliament